Edward F. Sherman served as the 20th dean and is currently the W.R. Irby Chair in Law at the Tulane University Law School.  He teaches Civil Procedure and Alternative Dispute Resolution.  He was previously the Moise F. Steeg, Jr. Professor of Law at Tulane.  He has taught at several other schools, including the University of Texas (for 19 years), Harvard Law School, Stanford Law School, and the University of London.  Through the United States Agency for International Development (USAID) he helped Vietnam write a new code of civil procedure.  In 1970, he was a founding board member of the Lawyers Military Defense Committee, which provided free-of-charge civilian counsel to U.S. military members in Vietnam and West Germany.

Education
Sherman has five degrees.  He earned his BA from Georgetown University, two MA degrees from the University of Texas at El Paso, and both an LLB and SJD from Harvard University.

Policy stances
Clients should generally attend ADR proceedings.
There should be an exception to the mediator-confidentiality privilege when a court needs to obtain information relevant to determining compliance with a court order to participate in ADR in good faith.

Awards
2004 winner of the ABA Robert B. McKay Award for the law professor who had contributed most to the advancement of justice, scholarship and the legal profession.

Publications
Sherman has authored or edited 19 books and has contributed chapters to 20 more.  He has also authored over 50 articles, including two in the Yale Law Journal.  Some of his more widely know contributions are listed below.

Books
Processes of Dispute Resolution: The Role of Lawyers (with Rau & Peppet) (Foundation Press 4th ed. 2006).
Civil Procedure: A Modern Approach (with Marcus & Redish) (West Pub. Co. 1988, 1995, 2000, 4th ed. 2005).
Complex Litigation: Cases and Materials on Advanced Civil Procedure (with Marcus) (West Pub. Co. 1985, 1992, 1998, 4th ed. 2004).
Texas ADR & Aribration: Statutes and Commentary (with Rau and Shannon) (West Group 3rd ed.) (2000).
ADR and Civil Procedure (translated by Prof. Masahiko Omura) (Chuo Univ. Press 1997).
Cases and Materials on Military Law: The Scope of Military Authority in a Democracy (with Zillman & Blaustein) (Matthew Bender 1978).

Articles
"The MDL Model for Resolving Complex Litigation If a Class Action Is Not Possible," 82 TUL. L. REV. ___ (2008).
“Consumer Class Actions: Decline and Fall?,” ABA JOURNAL 51 (June 2007).
“Evolving Military Justice,” 67 Journal of Military History 999 (July 2003).
The Evolution of American Civil Trial Process Towards Greater Congruence with Continental Trial Practice, 7 TUL. J. INT'L & COMP. L. 125 (1999).
Introduction: A Tribute to Professor Athanassios Yiannopoulos, 73 TUL. L. REV. 1017 (1999).
From “Loser Pays” to Modified Offer of Judgment Rules: Reconciling Incentives to Settle with Access to Justice, 76 TEX. L. REV. 1863 (1998).
"Good Faith" Participation in Mediation: Aspirational, Not Mandatory, 4 DISP. RES. MAG. 14 (1997).
Confidentiality in ADR Proceedings: Policy Issues Arising from the Texas Experience, 38 S. TEX. L. REV. 541 (1997).
A Process Model and Agenda for Civil Justice Reforms in the States, 46 STAN. L. REV. 1553 (1994).
Managing Complex Litigation: Procedures and Strategies for Lawyers and Courts, 57 TEX. B.J. 149 (1994).
Court-Mandated Alternative Dispute Resolution: What Form of Participation Should Be Required?, 46 S.M.U. L. REV. 2079 (1993).
The Immigration Laws and the “Right to Hear” Protected by Academic Freedom, 66 TEX. L. REV. 1547 (1988).
Restructuring the Trial Process in the Age of Complex Litigation, 63 TEX. L. REV. 721 (1984).
Traditional and Developing Concepts of Governmental Liability, INST. ON PUBLIC LAW LIABILITY OF PUBLIC OFFICIALS AND EMPLOYEES (State Bar of Texas, 1981).
The Development, Discovery, and Use of Computer Support Systems in Achieving Efficiency in Litigation, 79 COLUM. L. REV. 267 (1979).
A Special Kind of Justice, 84 YALE L.J. 373 (1974).
Military Justice Without Military Control, 82 YALE L.J. 1398 (1973).
Congressional Proposals for Reform of Military Law, 10 AM. CRIM. L. REV. 25 (1971).
The Right to Representation by Out-of-State Attorneys in Civil Rights Cases, 4 HARV. C.R.-C.L. L. REV. 65 (1968).
The Use of Public Opinion Polls in Continuance and Venue Hearings, 50 A.B.A. J. 357 (1964).

See also
Tulane University Law School

References

External links
Faculty profile at the Tulane University Law School.

Year of birth missing (living people)
Living people
Tulane University Law School faculty
Tulane University faculty
Harvard Law School alumni
Georgetown University alumni
University of Texas at El Paso alumni
Harvard Law School faculty
Deans of law schools in the United States
Deans of Tulane University Law School